Aleksandra Ivanovna Koliaseva (born 18 August 1968) is a former Soviet Union and Russian road racing cyclist. She won a gold medal at the UCI Road World Championships in the team time trial in 1993 and 1994 and a bronze medal in 1992. In 1995 she became Russian national champion in the road race and in 1996 she won the Tour de l'Aude. She is the mother of racing cyclist Pavel Sivakov.

Sources
1989 
2nd Overall Giro d'Italia Femminile

1993
1st World Time Trial Championships

1994 
1st World Time Trial Championships 
1st Stage 2 (TTT) Tour de l'Aude Cycliste Féminin

1995 
1st Overall Masters Féminin 
1st  National Road Race Championship

1996 
1st  Overall Tour de l'Aude Cycliste Féminin
1st Wiesbaden Criterium

References

External links
 

1968 births
Living people
Soviet female cyclists
Russian female cyclists
UCI Road World Champions (women)
People from Izhevsk